Pia-Lisa Schöll (born 28 March 1991 in Oberstdorf) is a German curler. She is currently the alternate on the German National Women's Curling Team skipped by Daniela Jentsch.

Career

Juniors
Schöll played third for Germany, skipped by Frederike Templin at the 2008 World Junior Curling Championships, placing last (10th place). She played third for Germany in four European Junior Curling Challenges (2006, 2008, 2009, 2011), winning the event outright in 2008 (qualifying Germany for the 2008 World Juniors).  Schöll skipped the German team at the 2011 Winter Universiade, leading her team of Franzi Fischer, Josephine Obermann and Ann-Kathrin Bastian to an 8th-place finish.

Women's
After her youth career, Schöll found success in mixed curling. She won a gold medal at the 2013 European Mixed Curling Championship, playing lead for Andy Kapp. She also played in the inaugural World Mixed Championship, again playing lead for Kapp's German team. The rink lost in the quarterfinals of the event.

Also in 2015, Schöll joined the Daniela Driendl rink as her lead. They represented Germany at the 2015 World Women's Curling Championship, finishing in 9th place.  The team played in the 2015 European Curling Championships where they finished in 7th place. Later in the season, they played in the 2016 Ford World Women's Curling Championship, finishing 10th.

Personal life
Schöll was employed as a sports soldier  and studies now psychology at the University of Mannheim with a top-level sports scholarship from the Rhine-Neckar metropolitan region. Her mother, Almut Hege-Schöll won the world championships in 1988.

References

External links

German female curlers
1991 births
Living people
People from Oberstdorf
Sportspeople from Swabia (Bavaria)
Sportspeople from Mannheim
21st-century German women